Communist Party of Turkey/Marxist–Leninist (New Build-Up Organization) (TKP/ML (YİÖ)) was a clandestine communist party in Turkey formed in 1978 following a split in the Communist Party of Turkey/Marxist–Leninist – Hareketi (TKP/ML-Hareketi). Initially, the party was known as TKP/ML-Popular Unity (TKP/ML-Halkın Birliği). TKP/ML (YİÖ) accused the TKP/ML-Hareketi leadership of rightist deviations and neglecting the need for armed struggle.

TKP/ML (YİÖ) upheld the political line of the Albanian Party of Labour.

In September 1995, TKP/ML (YİÖ) merged into the Marxist–Leninist Communist Party (MLKP).

See also
List of illegal political parties in Turkey
Communist Party of Turkey (disambiguation) for other communist parties in Turkey

References

1978 establishments in Turkey
1995 disestablishments in Turkey
Anti-revisionist organizations
Defunct communist parties in Turkey
Hoxhaist parties
Political parties disestablished in 1995
Political parties established in 1978